Following is a list of senators of Dordogne, people who have represented the department of Dordogne in the Senate of France.

Third Republic

Senators for Dordogne under the French Third Republic were:

 Paul Dupont (1876–1879)
 Pierre Magne (1876–1879)
 Philippe Daussel (1876–1883)
 Jean-Baptiste Dupont de Bosredon (1880–1885)
 Oscar Bardi de Fourtou (1880–1885)
 Jean Garrigat (1885–1891)
 Jean Roger (1885–1901)
 Alcide Dusolier (1885–1912)
 Antoine Gadaud (1891–1897)
 Arnaud Denoix (1896–1917)
 Samuel Jean de Pozzi (1898–1903)
 Pierre Guillier (1901–1927)
 Jean Peyrot (1903–1917)
 Ferdinand de La Batut (1912–1930)
 Bernard Eymery (1920–1928)
 Albert Claveille (1920–1921)
 Léon Sireyjol (1921–1945)
 Marcel Michel (1928–1945)
 Félix Gadaud (1929–1945)
 Georges Faugère (1930–1936)
 Adrien Bels (1936–1945)

Fourth Republic

Senators for Dordogne under the French Fourth Republic were:

 Jeanne Vigier (1946–1948)
 Marc Bardon-Damarzid (1946–1955)
 Marcel Breton (1948–1951)
 Adrien Bels (1951–1955)
 Marcel Brégégère (1955–1959)
 Yvon Delbos (1955–1956)
 Pierre Pugnet (1957–1959)

Fifth Republic 
Senators for Dordogne under the French Fifth Republic:

References

Sources

 
Lists of members of the Senate (France) by department